The Municipality of Izola is a municipality in the traditional region of the Littoral in southwestern Slovenia. The seat of the municipality is the town of Izola. Izola became a municipality in 1994.

The municipality of Izola is officially bilingual, with both Slovene and Italian as official languages; however, Slovene de facto dominates in all aspects, being the sole official language of the government and business.

Settlements

In addition to the municipal seat of Izola, the municipality also includes the following settlements:

 Baredi
 Cetore
 Dobrava
 Jagodje
 Korte
 Malija
 Nožed
 Šared

Population
The municipality has 15,900 inhabitants. There are marginally more males (8,000) than females (7,900). By native language, the vast majority of the population is native speakers of Slovene (10,059), followed by Croatian (1,199), Italian (620), and other smaller minorities.

Population by native language, 2002 census
Slovene       10,059 (69.14%)
Croatian        1,199 (8.24%)
Italian         620 (4.26%)
Serbo-Croatian  562 (3.86%)
Bosnian         537 (3.69%)
Serbian         385 (2.65%)
Macedonian      124 (0.85%)
Albanian        93 (0.64%)
Hungarian      19 (0.13%)
German            10 (0.07%)
Others or unknown 941 (6.47%)
Total 14,549

References

External links

Municipality of Izola on Geopedia
Izola municipal site

 
Izola
1994 establishments in Slovenia